Carissa Véliz  is a Mexican, Spanish, and British philosopher. She is an associate professor of philosophy and ethics at the University of Oxford (Institute for Ethics in AI, Faculty of Philosophy).

Life and career 

Carissa Véliz studied a Bacherlor's degree in Philosophy at the University of Salamanca. Later she studied a master of arts (MA) in Philosophy at the CUNY Graduate Center. She got a doctorate (PhD) in Philosophy from the University of Oxford, with the doctoral thesis "On Privacy", which concerns the ethics and political philosophy of privacy.

She is an Associate Professor of philosophy and ethics at the University of Oxford (Institute for Ethics in AI, Faculty of Philosophy), and a Fellow at Hertford College. Her work and area of specialisation is ethics of artificial intelligence (AI Ethics), applied philosophy, ethics, moral philosophy, political philosophy and practical ethics.

In 2020 she published her first book, "Privacy Is Power", about the ethics and political philosophy surrounding privacy. It became an Economist Book of the Year

Work 

 Privacy is Power, 2020.

References 

Living people
1986 births
Mexican philosophers
Spanish philosophers
21st-century philosophers
University of Salamanca alumni
Graduate Center, CUNY alumni
Alumni of the University of Oxford
Academics of the University of Oxford
Fellows of Hertford College, Oxford
Artificial intelligence ethicists